Princeton is a settlement in Newfoundland and Labrador.

The population is just over 100 households.

References

Populated places in Newfoundland and Labrador